Vernonia noveboracensis (New York ironweed or vein-leaf hawkweed) is a plant in the daisy family, Asteraceae. It is native to  the eastern United States, from Florida to Massachusetts and west to Tennessee, Alabama, and West Virginia and to southern Ontario.

Description
Vernonia noveboracensis is a herbaceous plant with alternate, simple leaves, on stiff, greenish purple stems. The flowers are purple, borne in summer and fall. This ironweed is an herbaceous perennial that spreads by seeds and runners. Ironweed can be an aggressive weed in moist soils.

See also
 Joe Pye Weed

References

noveboracensis
Flora of the Eastern United States